Jiří Ondra (born 7 June 1957) is a retired football defender.

During his club career, Ondra played for Bohemians 1905 and First Vienna in Austria. He also made 20 appearances for the Czechoslovakia national team.

External links
 
 
 

1957 births
Living people
Czech footballers
Czechoslovakia international footballers
Association football defenders
Bohemians 1905 players
First Vienna FC players
Austrian Football Bundesliga players
Czechoslovak expatriate footballers
Czechoslovak footballers
Czechoslovak expatriate sportspeople in Austria
Expatriate footballers in Austria